Timon pater is a species of lizard in the family Lacertidae, the wall lizards. The species is endemic to Northwest Africa.

Geographic range
Timon pater is native to Algeria, Tunisia, and Morocco.

Reproduction
T. pater is oviparous.

References

Further reading
Boulenger GA (1887). Catalogue of the Lizards in the British Museum (Natural History). Second Edition. Volume III. Lacertidæ ... London Trustees of the British Museum (Natural History). (Taylor and Francis, printers). xii + 575 pp. + Plates I-XL. (Lacerta ocellata Var. pater, p. 13).
Lataste F (1880). "Diagnoses de reptiles nouveaux d'Algérie ". Le Naturaliste 1 (39): 299, 306–307. (Lacerta ocellata pater, new subspecies, pp. 306–307). (in French).

External links
SRSWWW server at EMBL-Heidelberg
Photos of Timon pater

Timon (genus)
Reptiles described in 1880
Taxa named by Fernand Lataste